The Hellbenders is a 1967 Spaghetti Western directed by Sergio Corbucci.

Plot
Colonel Jonas is a fanatical and unrepentant Confederate who led a regiment called the Hellbenders in the recently ended Civil War.  Similar to Edmond O'Brien's character in Rio Conchos, he is determined to reorganise the Southern Army and defeat the Union.  With his sons Ben, greedy Nat, and rapist Jeff, he massacres Union soldiers transporting a consignment of banknotes and conceals the loot in a coffin supposedly belonging to a deceased Confederate officer, Captain Ambrose Allen, who was killed in the Battle of Nashville.
  
A drunken prostitute, Kitty, pretends to be the officer's widow. When Kitty is killed attempting a double-cross, Ben persuades Claire, a combination saloon hostess and professional gambler, to take Kitty's placeand then they fall in love.  They consummate their love during a gunfight between Jonas and a local bounty hunter.

The cool Claire proves her worth when feigning grief to a sheriff's posse who stop the wagon and wish to search the coffin suspecting the party may have been responsible for the theft and massacre. The party has another close shave when they stop in a town where the local minister who knew the late Captain Allen forces the party to stay for a memorial service where the town can pay their respects. Tension arises when the minister produces a man, Sergeant Tolt, who knew Allen's wife as well, but it turns out that he is blind (and so cannot identify Claire as a fraud). Tolt mentions possessing photographs of Captain Allen and his wife, so Jonas decides that Tolt must be secretly murdered and the photographs stolen.

Later the party is attacked by Mexican bandidos but is rescued by the American cavalry who capture several of the bandidos.  Heeding Claire's wishes, the soldiers escort the wagon to the fort where Captain Allen was a former commander.

Claire, resentful of Jonas' fanaticism, arranges for the coffin to be buried in 'her' husband's fort.  Jonas orders his sons to sneak back into the Union fort, dig up the coffin, and return the money to the wagon; in the meantime, he whips Claire and makes her stay outside of the cave where the group takes shelter in the storm, leading Claire to become gravely ill from pneumonia.

The group moves onbut their horses are killed by what appears to be a mad beggar but is a thief who wishes to rob them. They later fall afoul of Indians who were thought to be 'friendly' and would be agreeable to selling horses to the Hellbenders.  The chief demands that Jeff (who raped and murdered his daughter with a bayonet when he should have been buying horses) be handed over to him.  Ben denounces his family's fanaticism and offers the Indians all the money in the coffin, only to be caught in the crossfire between his arguing brothers, who shoot each other over the money; satisfied, the Indians ride away. The mortally wounded Jonas discovers that his sons dug up the wrong coffin that contains the remains, instead bringing that of Pedro the head bandido who promised Jonas they would meet again. As Ben and Claire watch on, Jones crawls away and dies by the edge of the river, as the flag of the Hellbenders regiment sinks to the bottom of the river.

Cast
 Joseph Cotten as Colonel Jonas
 Norma Bengell as Claire
 Julián Mateos as Ben
 Gino Pernice as Jeff
 Ángel Aranda as Nat
 Claudio Gora as Reverend Pierce
 María Martín as Kitty
 Aldo Sambrell as Pedro
 Al Mulock as The Beggar
 Enio Girolami as Lieutenant Soublette
 Julio Peña as Sergeant Tolt
 José Nieto as The Sheriff
 Claudio Scarchilli as Indian Chief
 Álvaro de Luna as Bixby
 Rafael Vaquero as Tyler
 Giovanni Ivan Scratuglia as Gambler in Denton Saloon
 Gene Collins as Union Soldier counting money
 William Conroy as Union Soldier
 Gonzalo de Esquiroz
 Martín Díaz as Search Party Lieutenant
 Rocco Lerro as Denton Saloon Brawler
 Mimmo Poli as Man in Saloon
 Benito Stefanelli as Slim the Gambler

Release
The Hellbenders was released in Italy in February 1967. It was released in Spain in November 1967.

Reception
In a contemporary review, "Byro." of Variety felt the film was not superior to the majority of other European Western films due to "indifferent direction, uneven color quality, and heavy-handed acting" and that Joseph Cotten gave "one of his weakest performances of his career." The Monthly Film Bulletin stated the film was "quite efficiently made but with the usual quota of gratuitous violence" and that the film's script was "more ingenious than most"

References

Footnotes

Sources

External links 
 
 DVD Review Review of the film & DVD at Vista Records

Films directed by Sergio Corbucci
Films shot in Madrid
Spaghetti Western films
1967 Western (genre) films
1967 films
Films scored by Ennio Morricone
Films shot in Almería
1960s Italian films